Margene "Margie" Heffman is a character on Big Love, the fictional HBO television series set among contemporary polygamists in Utah. The role is played by Ginnifer Goodwin.  The show focuses on the family of Bill Henrickson; Margene is the third of Henrickson's three wives, and the mother of three of Henrickson's children: Aaron, Lester, and Nell.

Biography
Margene is Bill Henrickson's third wife, and his youngest. She was raised by her single mother Ginger in a small town in Colorado, after her father left when she was 3. She later moved to Salt Lake City with her mother, who enrolled her in Catholic school.

After Margene graduated from high school, she began working for Bill at the Home Plus as a customer-service representative. When Bill hired her to babysit his children, she grew close to the family, and soon Bill, Barb, and Nicki made Margene their third sister-wife. She is generally easier for Bill to deal with than his other wives; Nicki has been in trouble several times in several ways, and Barb stands up to Bill more. This changed with the season-five revelation that Margene was underage when she married Bill.

The most sexual and amorous of the three wives, Margene has given birth to three babies, but she yearns for a sense of purpose beyond being sister-wife and mother. In seasons 3-5 she discovers her entrepreneurial talent.

Season One
Margene becomes friends with their neighbor Pam, who doesn't know she's married to Bill and tries to set her up on a blind date. Margene becomes pregnant for the third time.

Season Two
Margene becomes friends with Bill's potential fourth wife Ana. Margie's mother visits without knowing that Margie is in a polygamous relationship. Bill outs Margene as his wife to his business partners.

Season Three
Margene starts a business selling jewelry on a TV shopping channel.

Season Four
Margene's jewelry business is successful, though threatened by Bill's plan to achieve a political position, gain the trust of the people, and then out his family as polygamists in an effort to promote acceptance of polygamy. When Ana, who is pregnant with Bill's child, threatens to leave the country to be with her boyfriend Goran, Margene volunteers to marry Goran so he can stay in the country. They follow through and the marriage is disapproved of by Margene's family, particularly Bill and Barb. She kisses Ben which leads to his eviction from the house. However, Margene begins to develop feelings for Ana and Goran, leading her to question her marriage to Bill, Barb and Nicki, although Bill allows Ana and Goran to leave before Margene can decide whether or not to explore those feelings.

Season Five
Margene reveals she was 16 when she married Bill, having concealed her true age throughout the courtship. This has the potential for legal fallout for Bill, as the age of consent in Utah is 18. At the end of the season, following Bill's death, Margene is revealed to be spending most of her time doing humanitarian work overseas, returning only for important family occasions.

References

External links
 HBO Big Love biography of Margene Heffman

Big Love characters